The 2004–05 Slovak First Football League (known as the Slovak Corgoň Liga for sponsorship reasons) was the 12th season of first-tier football league in Slovakia, since its establishment in 1993. This season started on 24 July 2004 and ended on 15 June 2005. MŠK Žilina are the defending champions.

Teams
A total of 10 teams was contested in the league, including 9 sides from the 2003–04 season and one promoted from the 2. Liga.

Relegation for ŠK Slovan Bratislava to the 2004–05 2. Liga was confirmed on 25 May 2004. The one relegated team were replaced by FC Rimavská Sobota.

Stadiums and locations

League table

Results

First half of season

Second half of season

Season statistics

Top scorers

See also
2004–05 Slovak Cup
2004–05 2. Liga (Slovakia)

References

External links
RSSSF.org (Tables and statistics)

Slovak Super Liga seasons
Slovak
1